The history of the Catholic Church in the United States may refer to:
History of the Catholic Church in the United States
20th century history of the Catholic Church in the United States
19th century history of the Catholic Church in the United States
Catholic Church in the United States#History
Catholic Church and politics in the United States
History of Catholic education in the United States
Catholic sisters and nuns in the United States
History of religion in the United States#Roman Catholicism
Anti-Catholicism in the United States